Kazakov, or Kazakova (feminine), is a Russian surname meaning of "cossack" (kozak). Notable people with the surname include:

 Alexander Kazakov (1889-1919), Russian flying ace and fighter pilot during the First World War
 Alexander Vasilyevich Kazakov (1888-1950), Soviet lithologist and geochemist
 Aristarkh Kazakov (1878-1963), Russian revolutionary
 Grigori Kazakov (1913-1987), Soviet naval officer and Hero of the Soviet Union
 Ivan Kazakov (1873-1935), Russian painter
 Konstantin Kazakov (1902-1989), Soviet artillery marshal
 Matvey Kazakov (1738-1812), Russian architect
Mikhail Ilyich Kazakov (1901-1979), Soviet military leader and army general
 Mikhail Mikhailovich Kozakov (Kazakov) (1934-2011), famous Soviet theatre and movie actor 
 Mikhail Nikolayevich Kazakov (1920-1994), Soviet aircraft pilot and Hero of the Soviet Union
 Nikolai Kazakov (1918-?), Soviet poet from Mari El
 Rodion Kazakov (1758-1803), Russian architect 
 Stepan Kazakov (1914-1964), Soviet army officer and Hero of the Soviet Union
 Vasily Kazakov (1898-1968), Soviet artillery marshal and Hero of the Soviet Union 
 Viktor Kazakov — several people
 Yury Kazakov (1927-1982), Russian author of short stories

See also
 Kazak (surname)
 Kozakov (disambiguation)
 Kozak (surname)

Russian-language surnames